Glidewell may refer to:

Glidewell (surname)
Glidewell, Missouri